Richard John Cyril Allen (born 1 November 1963) is an English drummer who has played for the hard rock band Def Leppard since 1978. He overcame the amputation of his left arm in January 1985 and continued to play with the band, which went on to its most commercially successful phase. He is known as "The Thunder God" by fans. He is ranked No. 7 on the UK website Gigwise in The Greatest Drummers of All Time list.

Early life 
Rick Allen was born on 1 November 1963 in Dronfield, Derbyshire to Kathleen Moore and Geoffrey Allen, and started playing drums at the age of nine. He performed in the bands Grad, Smokey Blue, Rampant, and the Johnny Kalendar Band. When Allen was 14, his mother replied on his behalf to an advertisement placed by a band called Def Leppard looking for a drummer to replace Tony Kenning ("Leppard loses skins" was the advertisement's headline). He later joined the band on 1 November 1978, which was his 15th birthday. In 1979, he dropped out of school to concentrate on a career in music. Allen celebrated his 16th birthday with a performance at the Hammersmith Odeon, when Def Leppard opened for AC/DC.

Car crash and recovery 

On the afternoon of 31 December 1984, Allen was involved in a car crash, with his then-girlfriend Miriam Barendsen, on the A57 road in the countryside a few miles west of Sheffield. 
A car in front deliberately slowed for Allen to catch up, then sped up if he tried to pass, this went on for a few miles until in frustration, Allen accelerated to finally pass but lost control of the left-hand drive Corvette C4, which hit a dry stone wall and entered a field; his left arm was entangled in the seat-belt and severed, remaining in the car while Allen was flung out.  Doctors initially re-attached the arm, but it was later amputated due to an infection. Initially Allen felt 'defeated' but buoyed by 'family, friends and hundreds of thousands of letters from all over the planet'  he decided to continue playing drums with Def Leppard, and adopted a specially designed electronic drum kit. The band took a hiatus from onstage performances until 16 August 1986, when Allen was able to return to live drumming at the Monsters of Rock festival at Castle Donington. He has since re-adopted partially acoustic drum kits depending on the setting.

Equipment
Allen has used custom-manufactured cable routing by Whirlwind. He uses four electronic pedals for his left foot to play the pieces he used to play with his left arm, which from left to right trigger sounds of a closing hi-hat, bass drum, snare drum, and a tom drum.  
 
In 2009, Yamaha announced the addition of Rick Allen to their artist roster. Allen plays Yamaha Oak Custom drums with a matching subkick. Allen also uses Remo drumheads (usually he has coated Ambassadors on his drums and a clear Powerstroke 3 on his bass drum), Zildjian cymbals (mostly K customs, Z Customs and A customs), Ahead drumsticks and an LP rock cowbell. He previously used Paiste 2002, RUDE and Sound Creation cymbals.

Charitable works 
Allen and his wife Lauren Monroe are the co-founders of the Raven Drum Foundation, a charity. Allen also formed the One Hand Drum Company to provide funding for the Raven Drum Foundation. The company primarily sells merchandise featuring "Stick Rick", an illustrated character representing Allen.

Personal life 
Allen was married to Stacy Lauren Gilbert from 1991 to 2000. In 1995, Allen was arrested for spousal abuse and was sentenced to a work crew and ordered to attend Alcoholics Anonymous meetings. He is married to Lauren Cuggino Monroe; Monroe is also a musician and Allen has contributed to some of her albums. Allen is a vegan.

On the weekend of March 12, 2023, while standing in the parking valet area of the Four Seasons Hotel in Fort Lauderdale, Florida, where he was staying for a performance at the Seminole Hard Rock Hotel & Casino Hollywood, Allen was attacked by a "spring-breaker" who intentionally ran towards and collided with him, knocking him to the ground. Allen sustained a head injury. The attacker, Max Hartley, was apprehended and charged with several crimes.

References

External links 
RickAllen.com
The Raven Drum Foundation
Rick Allen @ DefLeppard.com

1963 births
Def Leppard members
English amputees
English rock drummers
English heavy metal drummers
Living people
People from Dronfield
Amputee musicians